The 2010 Nordic Figure Skating Championships was held between February 4 and 7, 2010 at the Askerhallen in Asker, Norway. Skaters competed in the disciplines of men's singles and ladies' singles on the senior, junior, and novice levels.

Eligibility
The senior-level competition was open to all ISU member nations. The junior and novice level competitions was open to skaters from Denmark, Iceland, Norway, Sweden, and Finland.

Nordic countries were allowed to enter 3 skaters in the senior and novice events and 4 skaters in the junior events. Non-Nordic ISU members were allowed to enter 1 skater in each senior event.

Senior results

Men

Ladies

Junior results

Men

Ladies

Novice results

Boys

Girls

References

External links
 2010 Nordic Championships
 
 
 
 Entries
 Results page

Nordic Figure Skating Championships, 2010
Nordic Figure Skating Championships
International figure skating competitions hosted by Norway
Nordic Figure Skating Championships, 2010